Uduak Isong Oguamanam  is a Nigerian Nollywood scriptwriter, producer and entrepreneur based in Lagos, Nigeria. She is best known for the comedy films Okon Lagos (2011) and its sequel Okon Goes To School (2013), Lost In London (2017), and Desperate Housegirls (2015). Falling (film) (2015) is Isong Oguamanam's first film under her own production company, Closer Pictures, based in Lagos, Nigeria.

Early life and education
Oguamanam is from Akwa Ibom State, South-South Nigeria. She is married to Chidi Oguamanam, a medical doctor. Her sister is Nollywood director and producer Emem Isong Misodi. Isong Oguamanam studied Communication Arts and Russian languages from the University of Ibadan, Ibadan, Nigeria.

She has a master's degree in New Media and Society from the University of Leicester. She also has a Diploma in French from Alliance Francaiein, Lagos, Nigeria.

Career
Oguamanam's first job was in the aviation industry as a cabin crew member for two years. She also worked in the capital market and telecoms industry. Oguamanam began writing prose and poetry. She ventured into film "when it looked like it was the more lucrative thing to do". Her early films were produced through Royal Arts Academy, Lagos, owned by her sister, Emem Isong Misodi.

Oguamanam set up Closer Pictures, Lagos. Falling is the first film produced under Closer Pictures. Falling tells the story of love and betrayal. The budget for Falling was 10 million Nigerian Naira.

In 2010, Oguamanam directed her first film To Live Again. It was adapted from her short story which was published by Farafina magazine based in Lagos.

Training
Oguamanam has attended training and film-related events. She attended the Berlinale Talent Campus, in Berlin, Germany as a result of her screenplay Unfinished Business.

In 2012, Isong Oguamanam was chosen by the British Council, Nigeria to the UK-Nigeria creative world partnership programme, in London, UK.

She also attended workshops at Raindance in the UK.

Awards
In 2006, Oguamanam was awarded the Commonwealth Short Story Prize.

Advocacy and social work
Oguamanam tackles societal issues though her work. Her first project, To Live Again, deals with the stigmatization faced by people living with HIV. In 2012, she produced and co-wrote Kokomma which tackled female sexual abuse. Her film, Fine Girl (2016), is the story of a young girl who turns to prostitution to save her dying father.

Oguamanam also speaks on issues affecting Nollywood. In February 2018, she advised fellow film producers to "let other people sing their praise" in response to producers releasing unverified box office figures.

Okon
Oguamanam created the Okon character with the first in the series, Okon Lagos (2011). Actor Imeh Bishop Umoh acted as Okon. There are other films in the series such as Okon Goes To School (2013). Lost In London (2017) is the latest in the series, that continues Okon's adventures in Lagos.

Filmography
Okon Lagos (2011), Okon Goes to School (2013),  Kokomma (2012), Lost In London (2017), Kiss and Tell (2011), Desperate House Girls (2015), Fine Girl (2016), It’s About Your husband (2016),  American Boy (2017), Falling (film)  (2015), A Piece Of Flesh (2007), Holding Hope (2010), Stellar (2015), Unfinished Business (2007), Edikan (2009), Through The Fire & Entanglement  (2009), Timeless Passion (2011), Bursting Out (2010) Troubled Waters (2017), I’ll Take My Chances (2011), Weekend Getaway (2012), Beyond Disability (2015),  Champagne  (2015), Dining With A Long Spoon (2014), On Bended Knees (2013), Stolen Tomorrow (2013), Mrs Somebody (2012), Forgetting June (2012), All That Glitters (2013), Misplaced (2013), Lonely Hearts (2013), Getting Over Him (2018), Apaye (2014), The Department (2015),

References

External links
 
 

Year of birth missing (living people)
Living people
Alumni of the University of Leicester
Nigerian businesspeople
Nigerian screenwriters
Nigerian women film directors
Nigerian women film producers
Nigerian film producers
University of Ibadan alumni
Nigerian women writers
Nigerian chief executives
People from Akwa Ibom State
Nigerian film actresses